Aliabad (also Romanized as ‘Alīābād; also known as Ali Abad Hoomeh) is a village in Sarduiyeh Rural District, Sarduiyeh District, Jiroft County, Kerman Province, Iran. At the 2006 census, its population was 69, in 9 families.

References 

Populated places in Jiroft County